Armorica is an ancient region of Gaul.

Armorica may also refer to:
 Armorican terrane, or Armorica, a former microcontinent
 Armorica Regional Nature Park, in France
 Armorica (game), a card game

See also 
 Armorican (disambiguation)